Golub-Dobrzyń is a town in northern Poland, located on the Drwęca. Situated in the Kuyavian-Pomeranian Voivodeship (since 1999), it was previously in the Torun Voivodeship (1975–1998). It is the capital of Golub-Dobrzyń County and has a population of 13,060.

Golub-Dobrzyń was established on May 5, 1951 through merging two neighbouring towns having faced each other across the river Drwęca for centuries, namely Golub located in the Chełmno Land within historical Pomerelia and Dobrzyń located in the Dobrzyń Land within historical Kuyavia.

History

History of Golub

The village Golub, populated by Poles, was first mentioned in a document from 1258; Chełmno Land, or Culmerland, had been in the hands of the Teutonic Knights since 1231. The Teutonic Knights built a castle (1296–1306) and elevated it to town status. In 1421 all privileges of the town were confirmed by Grand Master Michael Küchmeister von Sternberg. Golub was severely damaged during wars in 1414 and 1422; the latter war called the Gollub War. The town became part of Poland according to the Second Peace of Thorn (1466).

The height of prosperity of Golub was reached during the rule of King Sigismund III Vasa 1611-25. The town was severely damaged during Polish-Swedish Wars, especially in 1626-29, 1655, and 1660, as well as the later Seven Years' War (1756–63). In the First Partition of Poland in 1772, Golub was annexed by the Kingdom of Prussia. From 1807-15 it belonged to the Duchy of Warsaw. It was assigned to the Duchy of Poznan in 1815, and in 1817 it was included in West Prussia. In 1871 it was included in Imperial Germany and was subject to Germanisation. According to the German census of 1890, Gollub had a population of 2,738, of which 1,000 (36.5%) were Poles.

In January 1920 it became part of Poland. In August 1920, the Red Army attacked the city. In 1939 it was annexed by Nazi Germany and most of dwellers were forced to sign the Volksliste.

History of Dobrzyń

Since the second half of the 17th century, Dobrzyń existed as a settlement on the loft bank of the Drwęca. In 1684 Zygmunt Działyński named the settlement Przedmieście Golubskie. In 1789 Count Ignacy Działyński founded the city of Dobrzyń. In 1793 after the Second Partition of Poland, Dobrzyń was annexed by the Kingdom of Prussia. From 1807-15 it belonged to the Duchy of Warsaw. In 1815 it was included in the Kingdom of Poland in personal union with the Russian Empire. In the second half of the 19th century the Kingdom of Poland was de facto  demoted and renamed Vistula Land, while the city developed quickly with a growing Jewish population, eventually surpassing Golub.

Dobrzyń became part of the Second Polish Republic in 1918 following World War I. In August 1920, the Soviet Red Army attacked the city. In 1939 it was annexed by Nazi Germany and most of its dwellers were deported to Nazi concentration camps. The local intelligentsia was murdered through executions.

Monuments and landmarks
The Golub-Dobrzyń Castle of the Teutonic Knights, built at the turn of the 13th and 14th centuries, later rebuilt and extended in the 15th century. Between 1616 and 1623 it was a residence of Anna of Finland; during this period a Renaissance attic was added. The castle was destroyed during The Deluge. In the 19th century, it was neglected and a gale caused the collapse of its attic. After 1945 the castle was rebuilt and renovated.
Gothic church of St. Catherine, dating back to the beginning of the 14th century, with the Renaissance chapel of the Kostka family
Relics of defence walls
Wooden arcaded house in the market square dating back to the end of the 18th century
In Dobrzyń - Classicistic church built between 1823 and 1827

The castle

International relations

Twin towns – Sister cities
Golub-Dobrzyń is twinned with:
 Plungė, Lithuania

References

External links

 Castle of Golub

Cities and towns in Kuyavian-Pomeranian Voivodeship
Golub Dobrzyn
Castles of the Teutonic Knights